John Stowell (fl. 1369–1402) was an English merchant and the member of Parliament for Malmesbury for multiple parliaments from 1369 to September 1397.

He was tax collector for Wiltshire in March 1395.

References 

Members of the Parliament of England for Malmesbury
English MPs 1369
Year of birth unknown
Year of death unknown
English merchants
Tax collectors
English MPs 1378
English MPs January 1380
English MPs 1381
English MPs September 1397